Andrena cervina is a species of bee, belonging to the family Andrenidae. The species is endemic to Cyprus.

References

cervina
Insects described in 1975